Shek Wu Hui is one of the 18 constituencies in the North District, Hong Kong.

The constituency returns one district councillor to the North District Council, with an election every four years. The seat was last held by Lam Cheuk-ting of the Democratic Party. It has been vacant since Lam's resignation.

Shek Wu Hui constituency is loosely based on Shek Wu Hui including Sheung Shui Centre, Sheung Shui Town Centre, Sunningdale Garden, Metropolis Plaza and Lung Fung Garden in Sheung Shui with estimated population of 19,841.

Councillors represented

1982 to 1985

1985 to 1988

1988 to present

Election results

2010s

2000s

1990s

1980s

Notes

References

Sheung Shui
Constituencies of Hong Kong
Constituencies of North District Council
1982 establishments in Hong Kong
Constituencies established in 1982